Aston Hall is a Jacobean building in Aston, Birmingham, England.

Aston Hall may also refer to:

Aston Hall, Aston on Clun, Shropshire
Aston Hall, Aston-on-Trent, Derbyshire
Aston Hall, Oswestry, in Shropshire
Aston Hall, Shifnal, in Shropshire
Aston Hall, Yorkshire

See also
Little Aston Hall, Staffordshire